Scourge of the Enthroned is the tenth studio album by Brazilian death metal band Krisiun. It was released on 7 September 2018 by Century Media Records.

Track listing

Reception

The album was praised as a great "comeback" after the poorly reviewed Forged in Fury, as Jay Gorania from Blabbermouth.net said: "Their efforts continue to pay off as 'Scourge of the Enthroned' is a marked improvement from 2015's 'Forged in Fury'." 

The album was also praised as a great comeback by Vicente Reckziegel from Whiplash.net, who stated: Scourge of the Enthroned' is a sensational album, rivalizing their classics 'Black Force Domain', 'Conquerors of Armageddon' and 'Southern Storm', and being far superior than its predecessor, 'Forged in Fury'."

After the release of the album, the band embarked on the "Slaying Steel Over Europe" tour, with the bands Gruesome and Vitriol on 32 shows.

The album was the band's first album to enter any charts ever, debuting on Belgium, Germany and Switzerland.

Personnel
Krisiun
 Alex Camargo – bass, vocals
 Moyses Kolesne – guitar
 Max Kolesne – drums

Production and artwork
 Andy Classen – recording
 Eliran Kantor – artwork
 Krisiun – production
 Dirk Behlau – photography

Charts

References 

2018 albums
Krisiun albums
Century Media Records albums